Abraham Stanyan (c. 1669–1732) was a British diplomat and politician who sat in the House of Commons from 1715 to 1717. He was ambassador to Austria and the Ottoman Empire.

Stanyan was the eldest son of Lawrence Stanyan of Monken Hadley, Middlesex and his wife Dorothy Knapp, daughter of Henry Knapp of South Stoke, Oxfordshire. His father was a merchant, farmer and commissioner of the revenue. He was the elder brother of the historian and politician Temple Stanyan.

After becoming a student in the Middle Temple, he served as secretary to Sir William Trumbull as Ambassador to the Ottoman Empire, and later to the Earl of Manchester as Ambassador to the Venice in 1697–1698 and then in France in 1699–1700.  He became a Clerk of the Privy Council, briefly between these appointments.  After a period out of employment, he appointed as envoy to Switzerland from 1705 to 1714, Ambassador to Austria from 1716 to 1717. He was appointed Ambassador to the Ottoman Empire in October 1717. He arrived at Adrianople on 24 April 1718.  He held these last two posts in a period when England held the role of mediator between the Habsburgs and the Ottomans, and having worked in the capitals of both powers Stanyan was an influential part of those negotiations. He was recalled on 16 May 1729 but did not leave Turkey until 18 July 1730.

On his return to England from Switzerland in 1714, Stanyan was appointed a Commissioner of the Admiralty.  At the 1715 general election, he was elected as Member of Parliament for Buckingham on the interest of his cousin, Lord Cobham. He gave up his seat in October 1717 on appointment to office as clerk in ordinary to Privy Council. He was a Whig and member of the Kit Kat Club.

Stanyan died in September 1732.

Works
 An Account of Switzerland, London, printed for Jacob Tonson, 1714.

References

The National Portrait Gallery
The English Embassy at Constantinople, 1660–1762, A.C. Wood, The English Historical Review, Vol. 40, No. 160 (Oct., 1925), pp. 533–561
Philip Woodfine and Claire Gapper, 'Stanyan, Abraham (c.1669–1732)’, Oxford Dictionary of National Biography, (Oxford University Press, Sept 2004; online edn, Jan 2008) , accessed 18 November 2008.

 
 

1669 births
1732 deaths
Ambassadors of Great Britain to the Ottoman Empire
English civil servants
British MPs 1715–1722
Members of the Middle Temple
Members of the Parliament of Great Britain for English constituencies
Lords of the Admiralty
Clerks of the Privy Council
Members of the Kit-Kat Club
Ambassadors of Great Britain to the Holy Roman Emperor